Comiphyton is a genus of flowering plants belonging to the family Rhizophoraceae.

Its native range is Western Central Tropical Africa.

Species:
 Comiphyton gabonense Floret

References

Rhizophoraceae
Malpighiales genera